Cyperus turrillii is a species of sedge that is native to parts of central and southern Africa.

The species was first formally described by the botanist Georg Kükenthal in 1931.

See also
 List of Cyperus species

References

turrillii
Taxa named by Georg Kükenthal
Plants described in 1931
Flora of Angola
Flora of Zambia
Flora of the Democratic Republic of the Congo
Flora of the Republic of the Congo
Flora of Botswana
Flora of Tanzania
Flora of Zimbabwe
Flora of Malawi